The 2016 Australian Football League finals series was the 120th annual edition of the VFL/AFL final series, the Australian rules football tournament staged to determine the winner of the 2016 AFL Premiership Season. The series ran over four weekends in September and October 2016, culminating with the 2016 AFL Grand Final, between the Sydney Swans and the Western Bulldogs at the Melbourne Cricket Ground on 1 October 2016. The Western Bulldogs defeated the Sydney Swans by 22 points to end the Western Bulldogs 62-year premiership drought, becoming the first team in AFL history to win the premiership from seventh place.

The top eight teams from the 2016 AFL Premiership season qualified for the finals series. AFL finals series have been played under the current format since 2000.

Qualification 

Reigning premiers  and perennial finalists  each qualified for their seventh straight finals appearance, the latter a club record.

Venues
The matches of the 2016 AFL finals series were contested at six venues around the country.

As was the case last year, Melbourne hosted only four finals matches, including the Grand Final, with all four played at the Melbourne Cricket Ground. The Adelaide Oval and Domain Stadium each hosted one elimination final, and with the first and second qualifying finals being all-Sydney and all-Melbourne affairs respectively, it meant that each city hosted one semi-final and one preliminary final.

In Sydney, ANZ Stadium hosted the first qualifying final between the Sydney Swans and Greater Western Sydney Giants; the Sydney Cricket Ground hosted the Swans' home semi-final, and Spotless Stadium hosted Greater Western Sydney's home preliminary final. The AFL's contract to play Sydney finals at ANZ Stadium was not due to expire until the end of 2016, but it negotiated an early exit in response to the Sydney Swans having negotiated at the start of the season for an early exit to its own contract with the stadium. Under the renegotiated exit, announced in the week before Round 23 of the regular season, it was agreed that the two Sydney-based clubs would play their 2016 home finals at their own home grounds, except in the case of a Sydney Derby, which would be at ANZ Stadium.

Matches

The system used for the 2016 AFL finals series is a final eight system. The top four teams in the eight receive the "double chance" when they play in week-one qualifying finals, such that if a top-four team loses in the first week it still remains in the finals, playing a semi-final the next week against the winner of an elimination final. The bottom four of the eight play knock-out games – only the winners survive and move on to the next week. Home-state advantage goes to the team with the higher ladder position in the first two weeks, to the qualifying final winners in the third week.

In the second week, the winners of the qualifying finals receive a bye to the third week. The losers of the qualifying final plays the elimination finals winners in a semi-final. In the third week, the winners of the semi-finals from week two play the winners of the qualifying finals in the first week. The winners of those matches move on to the Grand Final at the MCG in Melbourne.

Week one (qualifying and elimination finals)

Second elimination final (West Coast vs. Western Bulldogs)
The opening match of the 2016 finals series saw the first final played on a Thursday night as opposed to the traditional Friday night start to a finals series with the sixth placed  hosting the seventh placed  at Domain Stadium. The  had qualified for their second consecutive finals series for the first time since 2010 and battled with injuries throughout the year, finishing with a 15-7 win–loss record. Despite this, they managed to beat the Eagles, Crows and  during the home and away season.

This was the first final between the two sides in ten years, with the Eagles defeating the Bulldogs comfortably in the 2006 First Semi Final, also at Subiaco Oval, by 74 points en route to securing the 2006 premiership.

The only meeting between the two clubs in the regular season saw the Western Bulldogs win a close-fought contest by eight points at Etihad Stadium in round 11.

Scorecard

Second qualifying final (Geelong vs. Hawthorn)

The second qualifying final, the only finals match to be played in Melbourne in the first week of the finals series, saw second-placed  face third-placed  at the Melbourne Cricket Ground. After missing the finals the previous year for the first time since 2006, Geelong produced a strong home-and-away season to finish in the top two with a record of 17–5.

This was the fifth finals meeting between the two clubs in the last nine years, dating back to the 2008 AFL Grand Final, which Hawthorn won. It also won the 2013 preliminary final and 2014 second qualifying final, while Geelong won the 2011 second qualifying final. On each of these occasions, the winner has gone on to win the premiership.

The only meeting between the two clubs in the regular season saw Geelong, on the back of a dominant performance from club debutant Patrick Dangerfield, win by 30 points at the Melbourne Cricket Ground in round one.

Isaac Smith missed the post-siren set-shot which would have sent Hawthorn straight to the Preliminary Final.  Smith's previous 11 scoring shots in finals had all been successful goals.

Scorecard

First qualifying final (Sydney vs. Greater Western Sydney)
The first qualifying final saw 2016 minor premiers the Sydney Swans face fourth-placed , who were participating in its first finals series since entering the AFL in 2012, at ANZ Stadium. On 25 August 2016, it was announced that the Swans would play all their finals matches at the Sydney Cricket Ground, which has a capacity of 48,000, except that if their opponent was Greater Western Sydney, it would be played at the larger ANZ Stadium, due to the potential for a large crowd.

After exiting the 2015 AFL finals series in straight sets, the Swans proved to be the most consistent team throughout the 2016 season, compiling a 17–5 record over 22 matches, having the best percentage of any team with 151.2, and only conceding 1469 points, the fewest of any team and 85 points less than the next-best defensive team, . The Giants, meanwhile, finished fourth with a record of 16–6 (after losing two of its first three matches) and a percentage of 143.1, the third-best in the AFL only behind the Sydney Swans and Geelong. Both the Swans and Giants were the only teams to have defeated both Geelong and Hawthorn at least once during the regular season.

The two regular season meetings between the Swans and Giants were split, with the Swans winning by 25 points at the Sydney Cricket Ground in round three, and the Giants returning serve with a 42-point win at Spotless Stadium in round twelve; the latter result was Sydney's heaviest defeat for the season, with their other four losses being by ten points or less.

Scorecard

First elimination final (Adelaide vs. North Melbourne)
The first elimination final saw fifth-placed  face eighth-placed  in what was the second final to be played at the Adelaide Oval. The Crows had entered the final round of the regular season in second place, with a chance to confirm its first top-two finish since 2012, but, without suspended midfielder Rory Sloane, lost by 29 points to the West Coast Eagles at home, and, with other results going against them, resulted in the club dropping to fifth on the ladder at the conclusion of the regular season. North Melbourne, meanwhile, entered the finals series in very poor form, winning only three matches after starting the season with nine straight victories, a club record, to finish eighth with a record of 12–10.

This was the first finals meeting between the two clubs since the 1998 AFL Grand Final, which Adelaide won by 35 points for its second (and to date, most recent) premiership.

The two regular season meetings between the two clubs were split, with the Kangaroos winning by ten points at Etihad Stadium in round one and an inaccurate Adelaide winning by 33 points at the Adelaide Oval in round 14.

Scorecard

Week two (semi-finals)

Second semi-final (Hawthorn vs. Western Bulldogs)

Scorecard

First semi-final (Sydney vs. Adelaide)

Scorecard

Week three (preliminary finals)

Second preliminary final (Geelong vs. Sydney)

First preliminary final (Greater Western Sydney vs. Western Bulldogs)

Week four (Grand Final)
Minor premiers for the ninth time, the Sydney Swans finished the home-and-away season with a 17-5 record. They were defeated by the GWS Giants in the qualifying final by 36 points, but bounced back with a semi-final victory against Adelaide, and then a 37-point preliminary final win against Geelong at the Melbourne Cricket Ground (MCG) for their third grand final appearance in five years.

Injuries ended the 2016 season for key Western Bulldogs players: captain Robert Murphy (round 3) and Jack Redpath (round 18) ruptured their anterior cruciate ligament, and midfielder Mitch Wallis (round 18) fractured his left tibia and fibula. Jason Johannisen and Matt Suckling also sat out for extended periods. The Bulldogs nevertheless won 15 games to finish 7th on the home-and-away ladder and qualify for the finals for the second consecutive year. Against the odds, they eliminated both 2015's grand finalists, West Coast and Hawthorn, in the elimination and semi-finals respectively. The Bulldogs then beat the Giants at Spotless Stadium by six points to qualify for their first grand final appearance since 1961. In doing so, the Bulldogs became the first team since Carlton in 1999 to reach a grand final after finishing the home-and-away season outside of the top four and the first team to do so under the current finals format that was introduced in 2000.

Sydney and the Western Bulldogs met in round 15 at the Sydney Cricket Ground. Returning from injury and with just four seconds remaining, Bulldogs defender Johannisen kicked a goal to defeat the Swans 11.13 (79) to 13.5 (83).

References

External links

AFL finals series official website

Finals Series, 2016